Alexander A. Dynkin  (Russian: Александр Александрович Дынкин; born 30 June 1946) is a Russian economist whose research interests and publications have been in growth, forecasting, international comparisons, technological innovation and energy studies. He is the President of the Institute of World Economy and International Relations (IMEMO) (Russian Academy of Science)

Notability 
 Elected for life as a full member of the Russian Academy of Science
 Economic adviser to Prime-Minister of Russia (1998-1999)
 1986 Order of the Sign of Worship 
 2006 Friendship Order
 Keynote Speech at UNIDO's Proceedings of the Industrial Development, Forum and Associated Round Tables, Vienna

References

External links
 'Institute of World Economy and International Relations

Living people
Moscow Aviation Institute alumni
Russian economists
Full Members of the Russian Academy of Sciences
Year of birth missing (living people)